Meggie Meidlinger is a member of the United States women's national baseball team. At 6'2", she was the tallest member of the US roster that captured the bronze medal at the 2008 Women's Baseball World Cup.

Playing career
Pitching at Dominion High School in Sterling, Virginia, she threw a complete game in a 10-0 victory over Briar Woods. She became the first female in the state's history to pitch a perfect men's varsity game. She was also the first female to win a men's varsity baseball game in the state. For her efforts, she was recognized in Sports Illustrated's Faces in the Crowd segment.

While she played in high school, she was recruited by Adriane Adler to play for the East Coast Yankees. She would also play for the New England Women's Red Sox and the Chicago Pioneers.

As a pitcher and first baseman, she was part of the Team USA roster that captured the gold medal at the 2006 Women's Baseball World Cup. As a side note, she was one of four teenagers to qualify for the Team USA roster in 2006.

Personal
Meidlinger studies architecture at Virginia Tech.

References

American female baseball players
Living people
Year of birth missing (living people)